Elmore Spencer (born December 6, 1969) is an American retired professional basketball player who was selected by the Los Angeles Clippers in the 1st round (25th overall) of the 1992 NBA Draft. Spencer played for the Clippers, Denver Nuggets, Portland Trail Blazers, and Seattle SuperSonics in 5 NBA seasons. His best year as a pro came during the 1993-94 season as a Clipper when he appeared in 76 games and averaged 8.9 ppg. Born in Atlanta, Georgia, he played collegiately at the University of Georgia, Connors State College (where he led the team to the NJCAA National title his sophomore year) and the University of Nevada, Las Vegas.

External links
College & NBA stats @ basketballreference.com
Elmore Spencer Upset @ query.nytimes.com (December 27, 1991 article)

1969 births
Living people
African-American basketball players
American men's basketball players
Basketball players from Atlanta
Centers (basketball)
Connors State Cowboys basketball players
Denver Nuggets players
Fort Wayne Fury players
Georgia Bulldogs basketball players
Los Angeles Clippers draft picks
Los Angeles Clippers players
McDonald's High School All-Americans
Parade High School All-Americans (boys' basketball)
Portland Trail Blazers players
Seattle SuperSonics players
Sioux Falls Skyforce (CBA) players
UNLV Runnin' Rebels basketball players
21st-century African-American people
20th-century African-American sportspeople